{{DISPLAYTITLE:C11H20O}}
The molecular formula C11H20O (molar mass: 168.28 g/mol, exact mass: 168.1514 u) may refer to:

 2-Methylisoborneol
 Methyl ether of Geraniol
 Methyl ether of Borneol